Alfonso IV may refer to:
Alfonso IV of León (924–931)
Afonso IV of Portugal (1291–1357)
Alfonso IV of Aragon (1327–1336)
Alfonso IV of Ribagorza (1332–1412)
 Alfonso IV d'Este (1634–1662), Duke of Modena and Regg